Sarcheshmeh-ye Kamalvand (also Romanized as Sarcheshmeh-ye Kamālvand) is a village in Dehpir Rural District, in the Central District of Khorramabad County, Lorestan Province, Iran. At the 2006 census, its population was 170, in 39 families.

References 

Towns and villages in Khorramabad County